Hakan Koç (born November 25, 1980 in Sivas) is an amateur Turkish freestyle wrestler competing in the heavyweight division. He studied at Selçuk University.

He defeated France's Vincent Aka-Akesse for the gold medal in the 96 kg division at the 2005 Mediterranean Games in Almería, Spain, in addition to his silver medal won at the 2005 Summer Universiade in İzmir, Turkey. He earned the bronze at the 2008 European Wrestling Championships in Tampere, Finland.

Koc represented Turkey at the 2008 Summer Olympics in Beijing, where he competed for the men's 96 kg class. He defeated Germany's Stefan Kehrer in the preliminary round of sixteen, before losing out the quarterfinal match to Russia's Shirvani Muradov, who was able to score three points in two straight periods, leaving Koc without a single point. Because his opponent advanced further into the final match, Koc offered another shot for the bronze medal by entering the repechage bouts. Unfortunately, he was defeated in the first round by Ukraine's Georgii Tibilov, with a two-set technical score (0–1, 1–3), and a classification point score of 1–3.

References

External links
 

1980 births
Living people
Olympic wrestlers of Turkey
Wrestlers at the 2008 Summer Olympics
People from Sivas
Selçuk University alumni
Turkish male sport wrestlers
Mediterranean Games gold medalists for Turkey
Competitors at the 2005 Mediterranean Games
Universiade medalists in wrestling
Mediterranean Games medalists in wrestling
Universiade silver medalists for Turkey
Medalists at the 2005 Summer Universiade
21st-century Turkish people